For the departamento in Argentina, see Orán Department.
Oran was a French département in Algeria existing from 1848 until 1974.

Originally a French province, it was departmentalised on 9 December 1848. Its principal town, Oran, was made the prefecture of the département. There were three French départements in Algeria: Oran in the west, Alger in the center, and Constantine in the east. Oran covered 67,262 km², encompassing five sub-prefectures of Mascara, Mostaganem, Sidi Bel Abbès, Tiaret and Tlemcen.

It was only in the 1950s that the Sahara was annexed into departmentalised Algeria, which explains why the département of Oran limited itself to what is the northwest of Algeria today. However, prior to departmentalisation, the two eastern territories of the south were managed by the department of Oran.

In 1956 an administrative reform aimed at taking into account the strong demographic growth in Algeria split the province into four parts, Oran, Mostaganem, Tiaret and Tlemcen, taking place on 20 May 1957.

After independence the department continued to exist until 1974 when it was split into Mascara Province, Oran Province, Saïda Province, Sidi Bel Abbès Province and Tlemcen Province.

References 
 "Département d'Oran." Wikipedia, l'encyclopédie libre. 30 July 2006, 21:08 UTC. 18 October 2005

Former departments of France in Algeria
States and territories established in 1848
Oran
1848 establishments in Algeria
1962 disestablishments in Algeria